The United States of America Mathematical Talent Search (USAMTS) is a mathematics competition open to all United States students in or below high school.

History
Professor George Berzsenyi initiated the contest in 1989 under the KöMaL model and under joint sponsorship of the Rose-Hulman Institute of Technology and the Consortium for Mathematics and its Applications.

As of 2021, the USAMTS is sponsored by the National Security Agency and administered by the Art of Problem Solving foundation. There were 718 participants in the 2004-2005 school year, with an average score of 49.25 out of 100.

Format
The competition is proof and research based. Students submit proofs within the round's timeframe (usually a month), and return solutions by mail or upload their solutions in a PDF file through the USAMTS website. During this time, students are free to use any mathematical resources that are available, so long as it is not the help of another person. Carefully written justifications are required for each problem.

Prior to academic year 2010–2011 the competition consisted of four rounds of five problems each, covering all non-calculus topics. Students were given approximately one month to solve the questions.

In the academic year 2010-2011, the USAMTS briefly changed their format to two rounds of six problems each, and approximately six weeks are allotted for each round.

The current format consists of three problem sets, each 5 problems and lasting about a month each. Every question is still worth 5 points making a perfect score .

Scoring 
Every problem on the USAMTS is graded on a scale of 0 to 5, where a 0 is an answer that is highly flawed or incomplete and a 5 is a rigorous and well-written proof. As a result, possible scores over the three rounds range from 0 to 75. The solutions are graded every year by a volunteer group of university students and other people with professional mathematical experience. In addition to their scores, students receive detailed feedback on how they could improve their solutions.

Historic score distribution

Prizes

Prizes are given to all contestants who place within a certain range. These prizes include a shirt from AoPS, software, and one or two mathematical books of varying difficulty.  Prizes are also awarded to students with outstanding solutions in individual rounds. Further, after the third round, given a high enough score, a student may qualify to take the AIME exam instead of qualifying through the AMC 10 or 12 competitions.

References

External links 
 USAMTS website
 Recent USAMTS Problems and Solutions and Older USAMTS Problems and Solutions

Mathematics competitions
Recurring events established in 1989